This is a list of contestants who have appeared on the VH1 reality television show Flavor of Love and its spin-offs I Love New York, Charm School, Rock of Love, I Love Money, Real Chance of Love, For the Love of Ray J, Daisy of Love, Megan Wants a Millionaire and Frank the Entertainer in a Basement Affair.

Contestants
  Suitor of the competition
  Winner of the competition
  Runner-up of the competition 
  Eliminated during the competition
  Quit the competition 
  Guest appearance

Note:

References

External links
 VH1.com

Participants in American reality television series
Flavor of Love
Flavor of Love contestants